Sven Delanoy (born 7 October 1983) is a Belgian footballer, who plays as a midfielder.

He has formerly played in the Netherlands, representing Willem II, RBC Roosendaal and FC Dordrecht, and in his native Belgium, where he was on the books of KV Turnhout, Sint-Niklaas, KMSK Deinze and KSV Temse.

Honours
Willem II
 KNVB Cup runner-up: 2004–05

References

1983 births
Living people
Belgian footballers
Association football midfielders
Willem II (football club) players
RBC Roosendaal players
FC Dordrecht players
KFC Turnhout players
K.M.S.K. Deinze players
Eredivisie players
Eerste Divisie players
Challenger Pro League players
Belgian expatriate footballers
Expatriate footballers in the Netherlands
Belgian expatriate sportspeople in the Netherlands
Sportspeople from Turnhout
Sportkring Sint-Niklaas players
Footballers from Antwerp Province